Trenton Gains Davis (October 10, 1913 - December 1983) was an American football player. He played for the New York Giants in 1936 for a total of six games.

References

1913 births
1983 deaths
new York Giants players